Esmir Hoogendoorn (born 31 March 1969) is a Dutch former professional tennis player.

Hoogendoorn started on tour in the late 1980s and reached a best ranking of 155 in the world, with her best WTA Tour performance coming at the 1992 Belgian Open, where she made it through to the quarter-finals as a lucky loser. She retired from professional tennis in 1994.

ITF finals

Singles: 2 (1–1)

Doubles: 5 (4–1)

References

External links
 
 

1969 births
Living people
Dutch female tennis players
20th-century Dutch women
21st-century Dutch women